Mokren Bight (‘Zaliv Mokren’ \'za-liv 'mo-kren\) is a 2 km wide embayment indenting for 850 m the west coast of Astrolabe Island in Bransfield Strait off Trinity Peninsula, Antarctica.  Entered northwest of Gega Point and southeast of the small peninsula featuring Petleshkov Hill, projecting westwards and ending in Damga Point to the south and Raduil Point to the north.

The bight is named after the settlement of Mokren in southeastern Bulgaria.

Location
German-British mapping in 1996.

Maps
 Trinity Peninsula. Scale 1:250000 topographic map No. 5697. Institut für Angewandte Geodäsie and British Antarctic Survey, 1996.
 Antarctic Digital Database (ADD). Scale 1:250000 topographic map of Antarctica. Scientific Committee on Antarctic Research (SCAR). Since 1993, regularly upgraded and updated.

References
 Mokren Bight. SCAR Composite Gazetteer of Antarctica
 Bulgarian Antarctic Gazetteer. Antarctic Place-names Commission. (details in Bulgarian, basic data in English)

External links
 Mokren Bight. Copernix satellite image

Bays of Trinity Peninsula
Bulgaria and the Antarctic
Astrolabe Island